Usk is a Welsh town.

Usk may also refer to:

Places

In Wales
 River Usk
 Usk Castle
 Usk Reservoir
 Usk Hundred, an ancient administrative division
 HM Prison Usk

Elsewhere
 Usk, County Kildare, Ireland, a civil parish
 Usk, British Columbia, Canada, a hamlet
 Usk, Washington, United States, an unincorporated community

Transportation
 Usk railway station (Great Western Railway), Monmouthshire, Wales
 Usk station (British Columbia), Canada
 HMS Usk (disambiguation), several Royal Navy vessels
 Usinsk Airport (IATA: USK), in northern Russia

Other uses
 Battle of Pwll Melyn or Battle of Usk in 1405, part of the Welsh War of Independence
 Thomas Usk (died 1388), under-sheriff of London
 Unterhaltungssoftware Selbstkontrolle, Germany's computer game rating agency
 US-K, a series of Russian, previously Soviet, military early warning satellites

See also
Uskside (disambiguation)